This is a list of vehicles produced by Bugatti (under Ettore Bugatti), Bugatti Automobili S.p.A. and Bugatti Automobiles.

Automobiles Ettore Bugatti (1909-1963)

Production cars
 1910 Type 13
 1912–1914 Type 18
 1913–1914 Type 23/Brescia Tourer (roadster)
 1922–1934 Type 30/38/40/43/44/49 (touring car)
 1927–1933 Type 41 "Royale"
 1929–1939 Type 46/50/50T (touring car)
 1932–1935 Type 55 (roadster)
 1934–1940 Type 57/57S/Type 57SC (touring car)
 1951–1956 Type 101 (coupe)

Race cars
 1910–1914 Type 13/Type 15/17/22
 1912 Type 16 "Bébé"
 1922–1926 Type 29 "Cigare"
 1923 Type 32 "Tank"
 1924–1930 Type 35/35A/35B/35T/35C/37/39 "Grand Prix"
 1927–1930 Type 52 (electric racer for children)
 1936–1939 Type 57G "Tank"
 1937–1939 Type 50B
 1931–1936 Type 53
 1931–1936 Type 51/51A/54GP/59
 1955–1956 Type 251

Prototypes
 1900–1901 Type 2
 1903 Type 5
 1908 Type 10 "Petit Pur Sang"
 1925 Type 36
 1929–1930 Type 45/47
 Type 56 (electric car)
 1939 Type 64 (coupe)
 1939 Bugatti Model 100
 1943/1947 Type 73C
 1957–1962 Type 252 (2-seat sports convertible)

Bugatti Automobili S.p.A. (1987–1995)
 1991–1995 Bugatti EB 110
 1993 Bugatti EB112 (Concept)

Bugatti Automobiles S.A.S. (1998–present)

Production cars
 2005–2015 Bugatti Veyron
 2016–present Bugatti Chiron
 2019–2021 Bugatti Divo
 2020–present Bugatti Centodieci
 2021–present Bugatti Bolide 
 2022-present Bugatti Mistral

Prototypes
 1998 Bugatti EB 118
 1999 Bugatti EB 218
 1999 Bugatti 18/3 Chiron
 2009 Bugatti 16C Galibier "Royale"
 2013 Bugatti Gangloff
 2015 Bugatti Vision Gran Turismo
 2019 Bugatti La Voiture Noire
 2020 Bugatti Bolide
 2020 Bugatti Vision

References

Bugatti
Bugatti
Car models
Bugatti vehicles